KEAG (97.3 FM, "Kool 97.3") is a commercial radio station in Anchorage, Alaska.  KEAG airs a classic hits music format.  Owned by Alpha Media LLC, its studios are located in Anchorage (two blocks west of Dimond Center), and its transmitter is in Knik, Alaska.

External links

1988 establishments in Alaska
Alpha Media radio stations
Oldies radio stations in the United States
EAG
Radio stations established in 1988